Andrew David Siciliano (born August 28, 1974, in Reston, Virginia, U.S.) is an American sports television anchor, reporter and radio broadcaster. He is the play-by-play voice announcer for the NFLs Los Angeles Rams. He was the sole host of NFL Sunday Ticket Red Zone, airing on DirecTV. During the week, he serves as a host for NFL Total Access on the NFL Network. He has also hosted coverage of the Olympic Games in 2014 and 2016 for NBC Sports's coverage, mainly for the online-only events network "Gold Zone", which features a format which is equivalent to that of Red Zone.

Education and early career
Siciliano was born  in Reston, Virginia to a Jewish mother, and an Italian father who was an attorney at the Federal Reserve. He attended South Lakes High School.

He attended Syracuse University's S. I. Newhouse School of Public Communications from 1992 to 1996. At Syracuse, he served as Assistant Sports Director at WAER, a student-run radio network. He also worked at the commercial WSYR (AM), covering fires and City Hall. He was a regular columnist for the Daily Orange, Syracuse University's independent student newspaper, and split play-by-play duties for WAER-FM during the  1996 Final Four March Madness game between Syracuse vs Mississippi State. Siciliano graduated in 1996 with a BA in broadcast journalism.

Professional career 
Following his academic career, Siciliano accepted a dual anchor/reporter role at WMAQ-670 AM in Chicago, Illinois. By 1999, Siciliano was hosting the Chicago Bears's post game talk show for the now-defunct WMAQ. During his tenure at WMAQ, Siciliano was honored with multiple awards, including two AIR awards for Best Sports Reporter and Best Anchor.

In 2000, Siciliano moved to Los Angeles to join Fox Sports Radio. He served as co-host of The Tony Bruno Morning Extravaganza, along with various fill-in anchor roles. He later moved to hosting the weeknight program Game Time Live, with Krystal Fernandez. While with FSR, Siciliano served as the lead play by play announcer for the Las Vegas Gladiators of the Arena Football League. In 2006, Siciliano moved from the Gladiators to the Los Angeles Avengers in order to work closer to home. In January 2011, Siciliano was replaced by Max Kellerman at ESPN affiliate 710 AM (KSPN), where he had been hosting LA Sports Live with co-host Mychal Thompson.

From its inception in 2005 to 2023, he was the sole host of NFL Sunday Ticket Red Zone, airing on DirecTV's Red Zone Channel. He also serves as a host for NFL Total Access on the NFL Network.

Siciliano has done St. Louis Rams preseason games as a play-by-play announcer, along with former Rams Pro Bowler Torry Holt and Hall of Famer Marshall Faulk locally in St. Louis on KTVI-TV Fox 2. Holt and Faulk served as color commentators for the broadcasts, and the two are joined by Siciliano, who handles the play-by-play duties.

Upon the Rams return to Los Angeles, Torry Holt was replaced with Pro Football Hall of Famers Marshall Faulk and Eric Dickerson with games broadcast locally on KCBS-TV channel 2. In 2017, Daniel Jeremiah replaced Dickerson.

Personal life 
Siciliano is an avid Cleveland Guardians and Cleveland Browns fan, whose ultimate goal was to serve as an NFL play by play announcer. He maintains a love for radio despite his television career.

References

External links
 NFL Bio
 NBC Sports Bio
 Siciliano on 'Cuse Conversations Podcast in 2022

1974 births
Living people
American sports radio personalities
American talk radio hosts
American television sports announcers
American television talk show hosts
Alliance of American Football announcers
Arena football announcers
College basketball announcers in the United States
College football announcers
Los Angeles Rams announcers
National Football League announcers
People from Reston, Virginia
S.I. Newhouse School of Public Communications alumni